In mathematical statistics, the  Kullback–Leibler divergence (also called relative entropy and I-divergence), denoted , is a type of statistical distance: a measure of how one probability distribution P is different from a second, reference probability distribution Q. A simple interpretation of the KL divergence of P from Q is the expected excess surprise from using Q as a model when the actual distribution is P. While it is a distance, it is not a metric, the most familiar type of distance: it is not symmetric in the two distributions (in contrast to variation of information), and does not satisfy the triangle inequality. Instead, in terms of information geometry, it is a type of divergence, a generalization of squared distance, and for certain classes of distributions (notably an exponential family), it satisfies a generalized Pythagorean theorem (which applies to squared distances).

In the simple case, a relative entropy of 0 indicates that the two distributions in question have identical quantities of information. Relative entropy is a nonnegative function of two distributions or measures. It has diverse applications, both theoretical, such as characterizing the relative (Shannon) entropy in information systems, randomness in continuous time-series, and information gain when comparing statistical models of inference; and practical, such as applied statistics, fluid mechanics, neuroscience and bioinformatics.

Introduction and context 
Usually,  represents the data, the observations, or a measured probability distribution.

Etymology 
In , the symmetrized form is again referred to as the "divergence", and the relative entropies in each direction are referred to as a "directed divergences" between two distributions; Kullback preferred the term discrimination information. The term "divergence" is in contrast to a distance (metric), since the symmetrized divergence does not satisfy the triangle inequality. The asymmetric "directed divergence" has come to be known as the Kullback–Leibler divergence, while the symmetrized "divergence" is now referred to as the Jeffreys divergence.

Definition

which is equivalent to

Relative entropy is only defined in this way if, for all ,  implies  (absolute continuity). Analogous comments apply to the continuous and general measure cases defined below.

Whenever  is zero the contribution of the corresponding term is interpreted as zero because

Also we assume the expression on the right-hand side exists. Equivalently (by the chain rule), this can be written as

Note that such a measure  for which densities can be defined always exists, since one can take  although in practice it will usually be one that  in the context like counting measure for discrete distributions, or Lebesgue measure or a convenient variant thereof like Gaussian measure or the uniform measure on the sphere, Haar measure on a Lie group etc. for continuous distributions.   
The logarithms in these formulae are usually taken to base 2 if information is measured in units of bits, or to base  if information is measured in nats. Most formulas involving relative entropy hold regardless of the base of the logarithm.

This reflects the asymmetry in Bayesian inference, which starts from a prior  and updates to the posterior .

Basic example

Kullback gives the following example (Table 2.1, Example 2.1).

This example uses the natural log with base e, designated  to get results in nats (see units of information).

Interpretations

Statistics
In the field of statistics the Neyman-Pearson lemma states that the most powerful way to distinguish between the two distributions  and  based on an observation  (drawn from one of them) is through the log of the ratio of their likelihoods:  . Kullback motivated the statistic as an expected log likelihood ratio.

Coding

Inference

Expressed in the language of Bayesian inference,  is a measure of the information gained by revising one's beliefs from the prior probability distribution  to the posterior probability distribution . In other words, it is the amount of information lost when  is used to approximate .

Information geometry

While it is a statistical distance, it is not a metric, the most familiar type of distance, but instead it is a divergence. While metrics are symmetric and generalize linear distance, satisfying the triangle inequality, divergences are asymmetric and generalize squared distance, in some cases satisfying a generalized Pythagorean theorem. In general  does not equal , and the asymmetry is an important part of the geometry. The infinitesimal form of relative entropy, specifically its Hessian, gives a metric tensor that equals the Fisher information metric; see . Relative entropy satisfies a generalized Pythagorean theorem for exponential families (geometrically interpreted as dually flat manifolds), and this allows one to minimize relative entropy by geometric means, for example by information projection and in maximum likelihood estimation.

Relative entropy is a special case of a broader class of statistical divergences called f-divergences as well as the class of Bregman divergences, and it is the only such divergence over probabilities that is a member of both classes.

Finance (game theory)
Consider a growth-optimizing investor in a fair game with mutually exclusive outcomes 
(e.g. a “horse race” in which the official odds add up to one).
The rate of return expected by such an investor is equal to the relative entropy 
between the investor’s believed probabilities and the official odds.
This is a special case of a much more general connection between financial returns and divergence measures.

Motivation

Therefore, relative entropy can be interpreted as the expected extra message-length per datum that must be communicated if a code that is optimal for a given (wrong) distribution  is used, compared to using a code based on the true distribution : it is the excess entropy.

The relative entropy  can be thought of geometrically as a statistical distance, a measure of how far the distribution Q is from the distribution P. Geometrically it is a divergence: an asymmetric, generalized form of squared distance. The cross-entropy  is itself such a measurement (formally a loss function), but it cannot be thought of as a distance, since  isn't zero. This can be fixed by subtracting  to make  agree more closely with our notion of distance, as the excess loss. The resulting function is asymmetric, and while this can be symmetrized (see ), the asymmetric form is more useful. See  for more on the geometric interpretation.

Relative entropy relates to "rate function" in the theory of large deviations.

Arthur Hobson proved that relative entropy is the only measure of difference between probability distributions that satisfies some desired properties, which are the canonical extension to those appearing in a commonly used characterization of entropy. Consequently, mutual information is the only measure of mutual dependence that obeys certain related conditions, since it can be defined in terms of Kullback–Leibler divergence.

Properties

 Relative entropy is always non-negative,  a result known as Gibbs' inequality, with  equals zero if and only if  as measures.

 No upper-bound exists for the general case.
 Relative entropy remains well-defined for continuous distributions, and furthermore is invariant under parameter transformations. Although it was assumed that the transformation was continuous, this need not be the case. The argument of the logarithmic term is and remains dimensionless, as it must. It can therefore be seen as in some ways a more fundamental quantity than some other properties in information theory (such as self-information or Shannon entropy), which can become undefined or negative for non-discrete probabilities.
 Relative entropy is additive for independent distributions in much the same way as Shannon entropy.

Duality formula for variational inference

The following result, due to Donsker and Varadhan, is known as Donsker and Varadhan's variational formula.

For alternative proof using measure theory, see.

Examples

Multivariate normal distributions
Suppose that we have two multivariate normal distributions, with means  and with (non-singular) covariance matrices  If the two distributions have the same dimension, then the relative entropy between the distributions is as follows:

The logarithm in the last term must be taken to base e since all terms apart from the last are base-e logarithms of expressions that are either factors of the density function or otherwise arise naturally. The equation therefore gives a result measured in nats. Dividing the entire expression above by  yields the divergence in bits.

A special case, and a common quantity in variational inference, is the relative entropy between a diagonal multivariate normal, and a standard normal distribution (with zero mean and unit variance):

For two univariate normal distributions p and q the above simplifies to

Uniform distributions
Consider two uniform distributions, with the support of one enclosed within the other. Then the information gain is:

Intuitively, the information gain to a  times narrower uniform distribution contains  bits.

Relation to metrics

While relative entropy is a statistical distance, it is not a metric on the space of probability distributions, but instead it is a divergence. While metrics are symmetric and generalize linear distance, satisfying the triangle inequality, divergences are asymmetric in general and generalize squared distance, in some cases satisfying a generalized Pythagorean theorem. In general  does not equal , and while this can be symmetrized (see ), the asymmetry is an important part of the geometry.

It generates a topology on the space of probability distributions. More concretely, if  is a sequence of distributions such that

 

then it is said that

 

Pinsker's inequality entails that

 

where the latter stands for the usual convergence in total variation.

Fisher information metric
Relative entropy is directly related to the Fisher information metric. This can be made explicit as follows. Specifically, up to first order one has (using the Einstein summation convention)

, it changes only to second order in the small parameters . More formally, as for any minimum, the first derivatives of the divergence vanish

and by the Taylor expansion one has up to second order

where the Hessian matrix of the divergence

must be positive semidefinite. Letting  vary (and dropping the subindex 0) the Hessian  defines a (possibly degenerate) Riemannian metric on the  parameter space, called the Fisher information metric.

Fisher information metric theorem 
When  satisfies the following regularity conditions:

 exist,

where  is independent of 
 
 
then:

Variation of information 
Another information-theoretic metric is variation of information, which is roughly a symmetrization of conditional entropy. It is a metric on the set of partitions of a discrete probability space.

Relation to other quantities of information theory
Many of the other quantities of information theory can be interpreted as applications of relative entropy to specific cases.

Self-information

The self-information, also known as the information content of a signal, random variable, or event is defined as the negative logarithm of the probability of the given outcome occurring.

When applied to a discrete random variable, the self-information can be represented as

is the relative entropy of the probability distribution  from a Kronecker delta representing certainty that  — i.e. the number of extra bits that must be transmitted to identify  if only the probability distribution  is available to the receiver, not the fact that .

Mutual information
The mutual information,

is the relative entropy of the product  of the two marginal probability distributions from the joint probability distribution  — i.e. the expected number of extra bits that must be transmitted to identify  and  if they are coded using only their marginal distributions instead of the joint distribution.

Shannon entropy
The Shannon entropy,

This definition of Shannon entropy forms the basis of E.T. Jaynes's alternative generalization to continuous distributions, the limiting density of discrete points (as opposed to the usual differential entropy), which defines the continuous entropy as 
 
which is equivalent to:

Conditional entropy
The conditional entropy,

Cross entropy
When we have a set of possible events, coming from the distribution , we can encode them (with a lossless data compression) using entropy encoding. This compresses the data by replacing each fixed-length input symbol with a corresponding unique, variable-length, prefix-free code (e.g.: the events (A, B, C) with probabilities p = (1/2, 1/4, 1/4) can be encoded as the bits (0, 10, 11)). If we know the distribution  in advance, we can devise an encoding that would be optimal (e.g.: using Huffman coding). However, if we use a different probability distribution when creating the entropy encoding scheme, then a larger number of bits will be used (on average) to identify an event from a set of possibilities.

The cross entropy between two probability distributions ( and ) measures the average number of bits needed to identify an event from a set of possibilities, if a coding scheme is used based on a given probability distribution , rather than the "true" distribution .

For explicit derivation of this, see the Motivation section above.

Bayesian updating
In Bayesian statistics, relative entropy can be used as a measure of the information gain in moving from a prior distribution to a posterior distribution: .

This distribution has a new entropy:

which may be less than or greater than the original entropy . However, from the standpoint of the new probability distribution one can estimate that to have used the original code based on  instead of a new code based on  would have added an expected number of bits:

to the message length.

If a further piece of data, subsequently comes in, the probability distribution for  can be updated further, to give a new best guess .

 may be ≤ or > than 

and so the combined information gain does not obey the triangle inequality:

 may be <, = or > than 

All one can say is that on average, averaging using , the two sides will average out.

Bayesian experimental design
A common goal in Bayesian experimental design is to maximise the expected relative entropy between the prior and the posterior. When posteriors are approximated to be Gaussian distributions, a design maximising the expected relative entropy is called Bayes d-optimal.

Discrimination information

Either of the two quantities can be used as a utility function in Bayesian experimental design, to choose an optimal next question to investigate: but they will in general lead to rather different experimental strategies.

On the entropy scale of information gain there is very little difference between near certainty and absolute certainty—coding according to a near certainty requires hardly any more bits than coding according to an absolute certainty. On the other hand, on the logit scale implied by weight of evidence, the difference between the two is enormous – infinite perhaps; this might reflect the difference between being almost sure (on a probabilistic level) that, say, the Riemann hypothesis is correct, compared to being certain that it is correct because one has a mathematical proof. These two different scales of loss function for uncertainty are both useful, according to how well each reflects the particular circumstances of the problem in question.

Principle of minimum discrimination information

(Note that often the later expected value is called the conditional relative entropy (or conditional Kullback-Leibler divergence) and denoted by 

MDI can be seen as an extension of Laplace's Principle of Insufficient Reason, and the Principle of Maximum Entropy of E.T. Jaynes. In particular, it is the natural extension of the principle of maximum entropy from discrete to continuous distributions, for which Shannon entropy ceases to be so useful (see differential entropy), but the relative entropy continues to be just as relevant.

In the engineering literature, MDI is sometimes called the Principle of Minimum Cross-Entropy (MCE) or Minxent for short.

However, this is just as often not the task one is trying to achieve. Instead, just as often it is  that is some fixed prior reference measure, and  that one is attempting to optimise by minimising  subject to some constraint.

Relationship to available work

Surprisals add where probabilities multiply. If  is  then surprisal is in nats, bits, or  so that, for instance, there are  bits of surprisal for landing all "heads" on a toss of  coins.

Best-guess states (e.g. for atoms in a gas) are inferred by maximizing the average surprisal  (entropy) for a given set of control parameters (like pressure  or volume ). This constrained entropy maximization, both classically and quantum mechanically, minimizes Gibbs availability in entropy units  where  is a constrained multiplicity or partition function.

When temperature  is fixed, free energy is also minimized. The change in free energy under these conditions is a measure of available work that might be done in the process.

More generally the work available relative to some ambient is obtained by multiplying ambient temperature  by relative entropy or net surprisal  defined as the average value of  where  is the probability of a given state under ambient conditions.

The resulting contours of constant relative entropy, shown at right for a mole of Argon at standard temperature and pressure, for example put limits on the conversion of hot to cold as in flame-powered air-conditioning or in the unpowered device to convert boiling-water to ice-water discussed here. Thus relative entropy measures thermodynamic availability in bits.

Quantum information theory

Relationship between models and reality

Just as relative entropy of "actual from ambient" measures thermodynamic availability, relative entropy of "reality from a model" is also useful even if the only clues we have about reality are some experimental measurements. In the former case relative entropy describes distance to equilibrium or (when multiplied by ambient temperature) the amount of available work, while in the latter case it tells you about surprises that reality has up its sleeve or, in other words, how much the model has yet to learn.

Although this tool for evaluating models against systems that are accessible experimentally may be applied in any field, its application to selecting a statistical model via Akaike information criterion are particularly well described in papers and a book by Burnham and Anderson. In a nutshell the relative entropy of reality from a model may be estimated, to within a constant additive term, by a function of the deviations observed between data and the model's predictions (like the mean squared deviation) . Estimates of such divergence for models that share the same additive term can in turn be used to select among models.

When trying to fit parametrized models to data there are various estimators which attempt to minimize relative entropy, such as maximum likelihood and maximum spacing estimators.

Symmetrised divergence

also considered the symmetrized function:

which they referred to as the "divergence", though today the "KL divergence" refers to the asymmetric function (see  for the evolution of the term). This function is symmetric and nonnegative, and had already been defined and used by Harold Jeffreys in 1948; it is accordingly called the Jeffreys divergence.

In the Banking and Finance industries, this quantity is referred to as Population Stability Index (PSI), and is used to assess distributional shifts in model features through time.

An alternative is given via the  divergence,

The value  gives the Jensen–Shannon divergence, defined by

where  is the average of the two distributions,

The Jensen–Shannon divergence, like all f-divergences, is locally proportional to the Fisher information metric. It is similar to the Hellinger metric (in the sense that it induces the same affine connection on a statistical manifold).

Furthermore, the Jensen-Shannon divergence can be generalized using abstract statistical M-mixtures relying on an abstract mean M.

Relationship to other probability-distance measures

There are many other important measures of probability distance. Some of these are particularly connected with relative entropy. For example:
 The total variation distance, . This is connected to the divergence through Pinsker's inequality:  Pinsker's inequality is vacuous for any distributions where , since the total variation distance is at most . For such distributions, an alternative bound can be used, due to Bretagnolle and Huber (see, also, Tsybakov): 
 The family of Rényi divergences generalize relative entropy. Depending on the value of a certain parameter, various inequalities may be deduced.

Other notable measures of distance include the Hellinger distance, histogram intersection, Chi-squared statistic, quadratic form distance, match distance, Kolmogorov–Smirnov distance, and earth mover's distance.

Data differencing

Just as absolute entropy serves as theoretical background for data compression, relative entropy serves as theoretical background for data differencing – the absolute entropy of a set of data in this sense being the data required to reconstruct it (minimum compressed size), while the relative entropy of a target set of data, given a source set of data, is the data required to reconstruct the target given the source (minimum size of a patch).

See also

Akaike information criterion
Bayesian information criterion
Bregman divergence
Cross-entropy
Deviance information criterion
Entropic value at risk
Entropy power inequality
Hellinger distance
Information gain in decision trees
Information gain ratio
Information theory and measure theory
Jensen–Shannon divergence
Quantum relative entropy
Solomon Kullback and Richard Leibler

References

 
 . Republished by Dover Publications in 1968; reprinted in 1978: .

External links
 Information Theoretical Estimators Toolbox
 Ruby gem for calculating Kullback–Leibler divergence
 Jon Shlens' tutorial on Kullback–Leibler divergence and likelihood theory
 Matlab code for calculating Kullback–Leibler divergence for discrete distributions
 Sergio Verdú, Relative Entropy, NIPS 2009. One-hour video lecture.
 A modern summary of info-theoretic divergence measures

Entropy and information
F-divergences
Information geometry
Thermodynamics